In the run-up to the 1950 general election, various organisations carry out opinion polling to gauge voting intention. Results of such polls are displayed in this article.

The date range for these opinion polls are from the 1945 general election until the general election.

Polling results 

All data is from PollBase

1950

1949

1948

1947

1946

References 

Opinion polling for United Kingdom general elections